William Edward Carney (January 16, 1878 – January 13, 1948) was a Massachusetts politician and court officer who served on the Boston Common Council, and as a member of the Massachusetts House of Representatives.

Massachusetts House of Representatives
Carney served on the Massachusetts House of Representatives committee on Public Service in 1913 and 1914.

Probation officer
In 1918, after he left the Massachusetts House of Representatives Carney became a Juvenile Probation Officer of the Charlestown District Court in Boston, Massachusetts.  On January 27, 1919 Carney was promoted to Probation Officer from Juvenile Probation Officer.

References
 Coolidge, Henry D.:, A Manual for the Use of the General Court for 1914, Boston, Massachusetts: The Massachusetts General Court, p. 459 (1914).
 City Council of Boston, Reports of Proceedings of the City Council of Boston for the Year Commencing January 1, 1909 and Ending February 5, 1910, Boston, Massachusetts: City of Boston, (1910).
 Massachusetts Commission on Probation (1920), Annual Report of the Commission on Probation, Year Ending September 30, 1918, Boston, Massachusetts: Commonwealth of Massachusetts, (1920).

Notes

1878 births
1948 deaths
Boston City Council members
Democratic Party members of the Massachusetts House of Representatives